Truth, Soul, Rock & Roll is the second full-length album by American rock band The Elms. The album was recorded from May through August 2002 and was released October 22, 2002, on Sparrow Records/EMI.

The first single from Truth, Soul, Rock & Roll was "Speaking in Tongues." The song had its video premiere on MTV2's 120 Minutes series in 2003. The second single from the album was "Burn and Shine," which reached #24 on the U.S. CHR charts. Truth, Soul, Rock & Roll was nominated for two Dove Awards in 2003, in the areas of Rock Album of the Year and Rock Recorded Song of the Year ("Speaking in Tongues").

Track listing 
 "Speaking in Tongues"
 "You Saved Me"
 "All the While Having Fun!"
 "Burn and Shine"
 "The First Day"
 "You Got No Room to Talk!"
 "Come to Me"
 "Let Love In"
 "Go Toward the Glow"
 "Through the Night"
 "Happiness"
 "Smile at Life Again"

Personnel 
 The Elms
 Owen Thomas - vocals, guitar, songwriting
 Christopher Thomas - drums, percussion
 Thomas Daugherty - guitar
 Keith Lee Miller - bass guitar
 Additional
 Brent Milligan - producer
 Richard Dodd - mixing/mastering engineer
 Blair Masters - piano, organ
 Jovaun Woods, LeAnn Palmore, Nirva Dorsaint - The TSRR Voices
 The Lovesponge Trio - strings
 Kristin Barlowe and Calvin Miller - photography
 Andy Norris - design

References 

2002 albums
The Elms (band) albums